DeuxMoi (also stylized Deuxmoi or @deuxmoi) is a pseudonymous Instagram account which publishes celebrity gossip.

History
The DeuxMoi account was originally used as a fashion-focused blog by two friends. During the COVID-19 pandemic, one of the two account holders asked its followers to share stories about celebrities. The account operator began posting screenshots of direct messages with stories of celebrity encounters for followers to see. The earliest stories concerned, respectively, Leonardo DiCaprio and Jonah Hill. Ownership of the handle, or the identity of those running the account, may have changed in 2021.

In November 2022, the proprietor of the account published a novel, Anon Pls. The novel, which is written with Jessica Goodman, follows a fictional version of the account creator's life.

Content
The account is known for publishing stories and celebrity information considered mundane, such as food preferences, or reactions to chance encounters with fans. The account's operator has said she does not publish "sad" stories, such as those about "family situations" or "substance abuse". The account does not verify the content it publishes. The account often highlights celebrity visits to New York City restaurants, such as Carbone and Via Carota.

Identity
In May 2022, Internet culture reporter Brian Feldman wrote that there are several individuals behind DeuxMoi. Feldman wrote that DeuxMoi's founders are Meggie Kempner, the granddaughter of noted socialite Nan Kempner, and Melissa Lovallo. Lovallo still apparently runs DeuxMoi.

Influence and reception
The account's focus on mundane gossip has been referred to as "toothless". DeuxMoi's focus on sightings at restaurants in New York has led to followers of the account dining at certain venues in the hopes of seeing celebrities.

References

Instagram accounts
2020 establishments in New York City
Gossip blogs